The 2022 Women's EuroHockey Junior Championship III was the seventh edition of the Women's EuroHockey Junior Championship III, the third level of the women's European under-21 field hockey championship organized by the European Hockey Federation. It was held in Alanya, Turkey from 26 to 30 July 2022.

The hosts Turkey won their first Women's EuroHockey Junior Championship III title by defeating Lithuania 2–0 in the final and were promoted to the EuroHockey Junior Championship II in 2024.

Preliminary round

Pool A

Final

Final standings

See also
 2022 Men's EuroHockey Junior Championship III
 2022 Women's EuroHockey Junior Championship II

References

Women's EuroHockey Junior Championship III
Junior 3
International women's field hockey competitions hosted by Turkey
Alanya
EuroHockey Junior Championship III
EuroHockey Junior Championship III
EuroHockey Junior Championship III
Hockey